Dorothy Rae Anstee AM DStJ (born 15 August 1932) was Director of Nursing at the Austin Hospital, Melbourne from 1977 to 1995.

Anstee received the Member of the Order of Australia award in 1993, in recognition of her service to nursing.

Anstee is Session Clerk of Scots' Church, Melbourne and chairwoman of the Scots Church Property Trust.

References

1932 births
Living people
Members of the Order of Australia
Australian Presbyterians
Australian women nurses
Australian nurses